Castle Camps is a village and civil parish in the South Cambridgeshire district, in the county of Cambridgeshire, England. The population of the parish (including Camps End) was 684 at the 2011 Census.

Previously named Great Camps and Camps Green, the village is named after Castle Camps, the castle within the parish's boundaries.

History

The parish of Castle Camps lies in the very south-eastern corner of Cambridgeshire. Its south-western and south-eastern borders separate it from Essex with the former following the line of the ancient woodland that separated the counties, and the latter probably representing the extent of the fence around the Castle. It also borders Shudy Camps to the north and has a short border with Bartlow to the north-west.

The hamlet of Olmstead in the south-eastern corner of the parish was sometimes listed as being part of Helions Bumpstead in Essex, and was part of its ecclesiastical parish, though part of Castle Camps for feudal purposes. It was included as part of Essex in the Risbridge poor-law union in the 19th century, and also sometimes listed as the Cambridgeshire part of Helions Bumpstead parish. The situation was only resolved in 1885 when it was transferred to Castle Camps for all civil purposes.

During the Second World War, Castle Camps, like may other parts of East Anglia, was home to a RAF station on the plateau to the south-east of the castle.  Established in September 1939, RAF Castle Camps operated as a satellite for RAF Debden and RAF North Weald and numerous squadrons flew from the airfield until its closure in January 1946.  The land was sold between 1963 and 1966.

Church
There has been a church in Castle Camps since at least the start of the 12th century. The present parish church, dedicated to All Saints since the 15th century, comprises a chancel, nave with south porch, and west tower. Situated to the north-west of the castle, the building largely dates from the 15th and 16th century, though elements of the chancel walls may have been built in the 14th century.

The medieval tower collapsed in 1850, with a replacement completed in 1851. Extensive refurbishment continued through the 19th century. John Ernest Bode was rector of the parish in the mid-19th century, and is known for writing the hymn "O Jesus I have Promised". He is buried in the church yard.

County High Point

Amenities
The village has one public house, The Oak (formerly The Cock but renamed in April 2019), situated on the High Street. There were two alehouses licensed in Castle Camps in 1682, and in 1800 there were 2 pubs – The George, which closed around 1910, and The Oak. The New Inn opened prior to 1871 and closed in the late 20th century.

Castle Camps also has its own primary school. The schoolroom was first built in 1866, when there were 96 pupils, and the building was extended in 1876 and again in 1886. Numbers rose to a peak of 160 in the 1880s, falling to 107 in 1914 and 75 by the 1930s. Pupils of secondary age were transferred to the newly built Linton Village College in 1937.

A building was bought to become the village hall in 1952.

See also
 The Hundred Parishes

References

External links

Village website

Castle Camps
Civil parishes in Cambridgeshire
South Cambridgeshire District